JCT600 Ltd is a privately owned franchise motor firm that operates throughout Yorkshire, Lincolnshire, Derbyshire, and the North East, with 54 dealerships between Boston and Newcastle. The company currently represents 25 of the world's most iconic brands and in 2020 achieved a turnover of over £1.117 billion,

Company history 
Yorkshire's largest family-owned business began life in 1946 as a single garage shop on Bradford's Sticker Lane. Originally called Tordoff Motors, the company was established by Edward Tordoff, before being taken on by his son, Jack. Jack Tordoff was a successful rally driver in the 1960s and 1970s and winner of the Circuit of Ireland Rally in 1973. Tordoff developed the business over the next 70-plus years, founding JCT600, before his son and current chief executive officer, John Tordoff, took over in 2002. Jack Tordoff died aged 86 in 2021 following a lengthy illness.

The company name, JCT600, came from the personal number plate of an archetypal Mercedes Benz 600 owned by Jack Tordoff, which he also used on his Porsche when he won the Circuit of Ireland Rally.  Since then, JCT600 has gone on to celebrate its 76th Birthday, employs over 2,400 colleagues and four generations later, remains a proud family business despite now being one of UK's largest motor retailers.

Sponsorship 
One of the group's most notable sponsorships is with Bradford City AFC, which is one of the longest running partnerships in English Football League History. In July 2022, of a three-year sponsorship deal extension which will extend the current agreement through to the 2025–26 season.  The late Jack Tordoff OBE, founder of JCT600, is the football club’s former honorary life president and was a lifelong supporter, regularly taking his two sons to Valley Parade throughout their childhood.

Manufacturers 
The group currently represents:

References

External links
 Official Website

Auto dealerships of the United Kingdom
Retail companies established in 1946
Companies based in Bradford